Le Fort fracture can refer to:
 Le Fort fracture of skull
 Le Fort fracture of ankle